Rizzoli & Isles is an American crime drama series based on the novels by Tess Gerritsen, starring Angie Harmon and Sasha Alexander as the respective title characters. It premiered on TNT on July 12, 2010, and set a record as cable TV's most watched commercial-supported series launch. The premiere was later recognized as the all-time most successful cable series launch, with DVR viewers the week of the premiere increasing viewership to just over 9 million.

Series overview

Episodes

Season 1 (2010)

Season 2 (2011)

Season 3 (2012)

Season 4 (2013–14)

Season 5 (2014–15)

Season 6 (2015–16)

Season 7 (2016)

Home video releases

Episodic viewership

References

External links

 Episode Guide on the official TNT webpage
 List of Rizzoli & Isles episodes at IMDb
 List of Rizzoli & Isles episodes at The Futon Critic

Lists of American drama television series episodes
Lists of crime television series episodes